Augustus Gough-Calthorpe, 6th Baron Calthorpe (8 November 1829 – 22 July 1910), was a British agriculturist and philanthropist.

Family
He was born at Elvetham Hall, Hampshire.
He was third son in the family of four sons and six daughters of Frederick Gough, 4th Baron Calthorpe (1790–1868), by his wife Lady Charlotte Sophia Somerset, eldest daughter of Henry Somerset, 6th Duke of Beaufort.
The family descended from Sir Henry Gough (died 1774), first baronet, of Edgbaston, whose heir Henry, by his second wife, Barbara, heiress of Reynolds Calthorpe of Eivetham, succeeded in 1788 to the Elvetham estates, and taking the surname of Calthorpe, was created Baron Calthorpe on 15 June 1796.

Education
Augustus was educated at Harrow from 1845 to 1847 and matriculated at Merton College, Oxford, on 23 February 1848, graduating B.A. in 1851, and proceeding M.A. in 1855.

Adult life
Gough-Calthorpe devoted himself to sport, agriculture, and the duties of a county magistrate. He lived on family property at Perry Hall, Perry Barr, then in Staffordshire, serving as High Sheriff of Staffordshire in 1881.

In 1870, he had a French Renaissance style house, Woodlands Vale, built near Ryde on the Isle of Wight; it was designed by Samuel Sanders Teulon. The nearby Calthorpe Road is named after the family.

On the death on 26 June 1893 of his eldest brother, Frederick, who was unmarried (his second brother, George, had died unmarried in 1843), he succeeded to the peerage as sixth baron.

He showed generosity in devoting to public purposes much of his property about Birmingham.
He made over to the corporation in 1894 the freehold of Calthorpe Park near (now in) that city, which his father had created in 1857, and took much interest in the development of the new Birmingham University. In 1900, he and his only son, Walter (1873–1906), presented 27½ acres of land, valued at £20,000, for the site of the university buildings, and in 1907 he gave another site, immediately adjacent, of nearly 20 acres, of the estimated value of £15,000, for a private recreation ground for the students.

On the family estates at Elvetham he started in 1900 what has become a noted herd of shorthorn cattle, and his Southdown sheep and Berkshire pigs were also famous.

Politics
At the general election of 1880 he stood with Major Frederick Gustavus Burnaby as Conservative candidate for the undivided borough of Birmingham, near which a part of the family estates lay, but was defeated, Philip Henry Muntz, John Bright, and Mr. Joseph Chamberlain being returned.

Death
He died after a short illness at his London residence at Grosvenor Square on 22 July 1910, and was buried at Elvetham, after cremation at Golder's Green.

Successor
He was succeeded in the title by his next brother, Lieut.-general Sir Somerset Gough-Calthorpe, 7th Baron Calthorpe (born 23 January 1831).
He married on 22 July 1869 Maud Augusta Louisa Duncombe, youngest daughter of the Hon. Octavius Duncombe, seventh son of Charles Duncombe, 1st Baron Feversham, by whom he had one son, Walter (who predeceased him), and four daughters.

Arms

References

Bibliography

1829 births
1910 deaths
High Sheriffs of Staffordshire
People educated at Harrow School
Alumni of Merton College, Oxford
English philanthropists
People from Hampshire (before 1974)
People associated with the University of Birmingham
6
19th-century British philanthropists